Allison Joy Haywood (born ) is a planktonologist from New Zealand.

Haywood completed her doctorate degree at the University of Auckland, focusing on molecular systematics. Her thesis project aimed to rapidly identify toxic algae which can cause serious food poisoning. The title of her 2002 doctoral thesis was Morphological and molecular systematics of unarmoured dinoflagellates (Gymnodiniales, Dinophyceae) from New Zealand.

In 2001, while working at the Cawthron Institute in Nelson, New Zealand, Haywood successfully applied for a fellowship from the L'Oréal-UNESCO Awards for Women in Science. She was the first recipient of such an award or fellowship from the Southern Hemisphere. Haywood used the fellowship to visit the Monterey Bay Aquarium Research Institute in the United States. Her post-doctoral work was at the Florida Marine Institute.

References

Living people
University of Auckland alumni
New Zealand scientists
New Zealand marine biologists
Year of birth missing (living people)
People associated with the Cawthron Institute